Dwayne Cowan (born 1 January 1985) is an English sprinter, based in Merton and a member of Hercules Wimbledon Athletic Club. Before taking up sprinting, Dwayne was a semi-professional footballer. He made his international debut at the 2017 European Team Championships, winning the 400 metres.  At his first Diamond League event, the London Anniversary Games, he came third. Cowan was selected to represent Great Britain and Northern Ireland at the 2017 World Championships

Personal bests
400m: outdoors 45.36s (London 2017), indoors 47.67s (Sheffield 2015).
4x400m split: 44.10s
200m: 20.73 seconds (Lee Valley)

References

External links

Personal website 
Twitter
Instagram

English male sprinters
British male sprinters
World Athletics Championships athletes for Great Britain
1985 births
Living people
World Athletics Championships medalists
Athletes (track and field) at the 2018 Commonwealth Games
Athletes from London
European Championships (multi-sport event) silver medalists
European Athletics Championships medalists
Commonwealth Games competitors for England